Pak Sha Wan is one of the 29 constituencies in the Sai Kung District.

The constituency returns one district councillor to the Sai Kung District Council, with an election every four years.

Pak Sha Wan constituency is loosely based on Pak Sha Wan with estimated population of 15,810.

Councillors represented

Election results

2010s

References

Constituencies of Hong Kong
Constituencies of Sai Kung District Council
1982 establishments in Hong Kong
Constituencies established in 1982